"Jours de fièvre" (meaning "Days of Fever") is a single by Celine Dion from her album Incognito. It was released on 5 September 1988 in Denmark only.

Background
The B-side of "Jours de fièvre" includes the track "Ma chambre", although the back sleeve of the 7" single indicates "Partout je te vois".

A music video was made for the Incognito TV special which aired in September 1987. It was produced by Canadian Broadcasting Corporation and directed by Jacques Payette.

Track listings and formats
Danish 7" single
"Jours de fièvre" – 5:08
"Ma chambre" – 4:10

References

External links

1987 songs
1988 singles
Celine Dion songs
French-language songs
Songs written by Eddy Marnay
Songs written by Jean Roussel